may refer to:

Places
 Kawabe District, Hyōgo
 Kawabe District, Akita
Kawabe, Akita
 Kawabe, Ehime
 Kawabe, Wakayama
 Kawabe, Gifu
 Kawabe Station (Aomori)

People with the surname
 Chieko Kawabe (1987- ), Japanese singer
, Japanese footballer
 Masakazu Kawabe (1886-1965), Japanese general
 Torashirō Kawabe (1890-1960), Japanese general
, Japanese footballer

Japanese-language surnames